The climate of San Diego, California is classified as a Mediterranean climate (Köppen climate classification Csa). The basic climate features hot, sunny, and dry summers, and cooler, wetter winters. However, San Diego is much more arid than typical Mediterranean climates, and winters are still dry compared with most other zones with this type of climate. The climate at San Diego International Airport, the location for official weather reports for San Diego, as well as the climate at most beach areas, straddles the border between BSh and BSk due to the mild winters and cool summers in these locations.

Temperatures

Temperatures occasionally reach  or higher. Snow and ice are rare in the wintertime, typically occurring only inland from the coast when present.

San Diego experiences marine layer clouds, most often between May and August, which cause cool temperatures, cloudy weather and fog in the morning. Marine layer conditions linger until the heat of the sun becomes strong enough to evaporate the clouds. The local sayings "May gray" and "June gloom" refer to the way in which San Diego has the most trouble shaking off the early morning fog during those months, and cool, cloudy conditions often last into the afternoon or even all day.

Temperatures soar to very high readings only on rare occasions, chiefly when easterly winds (known as the "Santa Ana winds") bring hot, dry air from the inland deserts. Although confusing to tourists, newcomers, and out-of-the-region newscasters, this makes October the fire season for San Diego and the rest of Southern California due to low precipitation and sporadic heat waves that the average monthly temperatures do not immediately show.

The record high temperature was tied only once and happened on September 27, 2010, 47 years and two days after the set record. Several cities near San Diego, including Los Angeles, broke their all-time records that day.

Precipitation
San Diego on average has 146 sunny days and 117 partly cloudy days a year. Rainfall is strongly concentrated in the cooler half of the year, particularly the months December through March, although precipitation is lower than any other part of the U.S. west coast. While the summer months are virtually rainless, subtropical moisture from the North American Monsoon usually results in increased humidity and thunderstorms for at least a few days each summer. Rainfall is highly variable from year to year and from month to month, and San Diego is subject to both droughts and floods. While hurricanes are very rare, San Diego receives more tropical storms and remnants of tropical storms than anywhere else in California. Famous examples include the 1858 San Diego Hurricane and the 1939 California tropical storm, as well as the remnants of Hurricane Kathleen in 1976, all of which brought several inches of rain and high winds to San Diego.

At the National Weather Service office, there are an average of 41 days with measurable precipitation.

Snow 
Snow has been recorded falling on lowland San Diego communities only five times in over 125 years of record-keeping. In winter, light snow is common in mountainous regions of east and north San Diego County (including Ramona and Julian) above .

Variation

Compared to national averages
On average, San Diego sees 21 days with some precipitation while the rest of the country sees about 110. The national average for mostly sunny days is 213 while San Diego's is 267. The United States average for days above  is 37.9 days while San Diego's is only 2.5 days, and there are, on average 0 days below  in San Diego, while the national average is 88 days.

Data

Sea temperatures
Water temperatures have risen since 1950 as measured at Scripps Pier.

Santa Anas
The months of September through February bring warm winds from the desert called "Santa Anas". Occurring about 10 days out of the year, these winds bring sometimes hot, but always dry conditions. They can spread and worsen wildfires. Because these winds blow from east to west, common perception is that they are pulling hot air from the desert. However, it is not uncommon during a Santa Ana condition for the coast to be even hotter than the desert regions. The Santa Ana winds are actually warm due to barometric pressure increases: As the air is pulled down to sea level from the higher altitudes of the Great Basin and Rocky Mountains to the east, it is compressed and its temperature rises.

Hurricanes

Since the track of most hurricanes is well to the south of San Diego, and the cold California Current (normally sea temperatures are only in the upper 60's F off the CA coast) keeps ocean water significantly colder than in the Gulf of Mexico and western Atlantic (often sea temperatures over 82 F), tropical cyclones rarely impact San Diego. Most northwestward moving tropical cyclones dissipate over Baja California and fail to bring any precipitation to San Diego. The only tropical cyclone known to impact San Diego as a hurricane in around 200 years of record-keeping was the 1858 San Diego Hurricane. Two more cyclones managed to bring tropical storm-force winds to Southern California: the 1939 California tropical storm and the Hurricane Kathleen (1976). Average surface temperature of the water at Scripps Pier in the California Current has increased by almost 3 degrees since 1950, according to scientists at Scripps Institution of Oceanography.

May and June clouds
During the months of May and June, a common natural occurrence brings a thin layer of clouds that covers coastal and inland communities. Some call it "May Gray", or "June Gloom".

Southern Oscillation
San Diego's wet winter season is influenced by the El Niño Southern Oscillation. During the El Niño phase, San Diego receives more winter storms with warmer and more humid conditions. During the La Niña phase, San Diego becomes drier with cooler and less humid conditions.

Ultraviolet index

See also
Climate of California
Horse latitudes

Notes

References

External links
USTravelWeather.com: San Diego Weather and Climate

San Diego
Geography of San Diego County, California
San Diego, California